The Mayor of Ravenna is an elected politician who, along with the Ravenna's City Council, is accountable for the strategic government of Ravenna in Emilia-Romagna, Italy. 

The current Mayor is Michele De Pascale, a member of the Democratic Party, who took office on 21 June 2016.

Overview
According to the Italian Constitution, the Mayor of Ravenna is member of the City Council.

The Mayor is elected by the population of Ravenna, who also elect the members of the City Council, controlling the Mayor's policy guidelines and is able to enforce his resignation by a motion of no confidence. The Mayor is entitled to appoint and release the members of his government.

Since 1993 the Mayor is elected directly by Ravenna's electorate: in all mayoral elections in Italy in cities with a population higher than 15,000 the voters express a direct choice for the mayor or an indirect choice voting for the party of the candidate's coalition. If no candidate receives at least 50% of votes, the top two candidates go to a second round after two weeks. The election of the City Council is based on a direct choice for the candidate with a preference vote: the candidate with the majority of the preferences is elected. The number of the seats for each party is determined proportionally.

Kingdom of Italy (1860–1946)

Republic of Italy (since 1946)

City Council election (1946–1993)
From 1946 to 1993, the Mayor of Ravenna was elected by the City Council.

Direct election (since 1993)
Since 1993, under provisions of new local administration law, the Mayor of Ravenna is chosen by direct election, originally every four, and since 2001 every five years.

Notes

Timeline

See also
 Timeline of Ravenna

References

External links
 

Ravenna
 
Politics of Emilia-Romagna
Ravenna